Kentucky Route 298 (KY 298) is a  state highway in Daviess County, Kentucky, that runs from U.S. Route 431 (US 431) and Sharp Road south of Owensboro to southbound KY 2155 and Old Hartford Road in southeastern Owensboro.

Major intersections

References

0298
Kenucky Route 298